Yarada Beach is situated on the east coast of Bay of Bengal in Yarada, a village at a distance of  from Visakhapatnam. It is located near Gangavaram beach, Dolphin's Nose, and Gangavaram Port. This is a very picturesque beach in Andhra Pradesh.

Scientific study 
A scientific study of the characteristics of the sediments deposited at the beach was conducted from May 2009 to May 2010. The study found that the location of Pigeon Hill has a major impact on how deposits are added to the beach and removed through erosion.

Transportation
APSRTC runs buses to this area with these routes:

See also 
List of beaches in India

References 

Beaches of Andhra Pradesh
Tourist attractions in Visakhapatnam
Geography of Visakhapatnam
Geography of Visakhapatnam district
Uttarandhra